City Central is a British television police procedural drama series, written and created by Tony Jordan, that first broadcast on BBC One on 4 April 1998.

Described by the Radio Times as "Z Cars for the 1990s", City Central follows the everyday lives of officers based at the inner-city Christmas Street police station in Manchester. Three series of City Central were produced, with the final episode broadcasting on 19 June 2000.

Background
The series was the BBC's third attempt to rival The Bill, following Waterfront Beat (1990) and Out of the Blue (1995).

Many media outlets claimed at the time of the first' series premiere that it had initially been written as a "star vehicle" for actor Paul Nicholls; although these claims were later dismissed by creator Tony Jordan. Nicholls claimed at the time of accepting the role of PC Terry Sydenham, he felt "troubled and depressed", and felt that a change of character would help him with his own lifestyle, after stepping down from the role of Joe Wicks on EastEnders in November 1997. However, before filming on the second series began, Nicholls asked for his character to be written out. He later commented, "I was well on my way to a total breakdown. I was drinking a lot and taking drugs. I had lost control of my life."

Aside from Nicholls, the first two series largely retained the same cast. The third series, the first not to be produced by Jordan, saw a change in the format. The series adopted a slightly less gritty feel, with more of the interpersonal relationships of the cast explored. An entirely new cast were brought in to fill CID, with Ray Stevenson, Ian Burfield and Kate Gartside all axed following the conclusion of the second series. George Costigan and Connie Hyde joined the series as DI Jack Carter and DS Janet Miller, respectively. Following the death of her son in the second series, Yvonne Mackey (Lorraine Ashbourne) appears in a civilian capacity only.

Notably, the series has never been released on DVD, and despite a single re-run on UKTV Drama in 2004, has not been otherwise repeated on television since its original broadcast.

Cast

Main
Paul Nicholls as PC Terry Sydenham (Series 1―Series 2, Episode 1)
Dave Hill as PC Pete Redfern
Ian Aspinall as PC Colin Jitlada
Ashley Jensen as PC Sue Chappell
Stephen Lord as PC Steve Jackson (Series 1―2)
Sarah Kirkman as PC/DC Mary Sutcliffe
Sean McKenzie as PC Nick Green
Michael Begley as PC Richard Law
Katie Blake as PC Judy Byrd (Series 2)
Martin Walsh as PC/Sgt. Clive Gardener (Series 3)
Lorraine Ashbourne as Sgt. Yvonne Mackey
Philip Martin Brown as Sgt. Paul Dobson
Terence Harvey as Chief Inspector George Barnard
Ray Stevenson as DI Tony Baynham (Series 1―2)
Ian Burfield as DS Ray Pickering (Series 1―2)
Kate Gartside as DS Jane McCormack (Series 1―2)
George Costigan as DI Jack Carter (Series 3)
Connie Hyde as DS Janet Miller (Series 3)

Recurring
Jennifer Luckraft as PC Kate Foster (Series 1―2)
John Brobbey as DC Danny Abbott (Series 1)
Andrew Redman as Inspector Mike Willis (Series 1)
Emily Hamilton as Lucy Barnard (Series 1―2)
John Biggins as Norman (Series 1―2)
Damian Zuk as Lee Mackey (Series 1―2)
Ciaran Griffiths as Simon Mackey (Series 1―2)
Christine Tremarco as Nikki Reed (Series 1)
Kate Reynolds as Debbie Jackson (Series 1―2)
Annie Hulley as Sarah Sydenham (Series 1―2)
Caroline Carver as Alison (Series 1)
Steve Huison as Brian 'Batty' Edwards (Series 1)
Andrew Lancel as Connor Rice (Series 2)
Jayne Charlton MacKenzie as Maggie Baynham (Series 2)
Julia Ford as Detective Superintendent Gagan (Series 2)

Episodes

Series Overview

Series 1 (1998)
 No episode was broadcast on 9 May due to the Eurovision Song Contest 1998.

Series 2 (1999)

Series 3 (2000)

References

External links

1998 British television series debuts
2000 British television series endings
1990s British drama television series
2000s British drama television series
BBC television dramas
1990s British crime television series
2000s British crime television series
English-language television shows
Television shows set in Manchester